John E. Huettner (October 21, 1906 – August 4, 1970) was an American sailor who competed in the 1932 Summer Olympics.

In 1932 he was a crew member of the American boat Angelita which won the gold medal in the 8 metre class.

References

External links
 
 
 

1906 births
1970 deaths
American male sailors (sport)
Sailors at the 1932 Summer Olympics – 8 Metre
Olympic gold medalists for the United States in sailing
Medalists at the 1932 Summer Olympics